CHSB-FM is a Canadian radio station that broadcasts a Christian Radio format on the frequency 99.3 FM in Bedford, Nova Scotia and serving the northern suburbs of Halifax. The station is branded as Hilltop FM.

Owned by the Bedford Baptist Church, the station originally received CRTC approval on July 26, 2006 to operate on 89.1 FM; however, a technical change to broadcast at its current frequency 99.3 FM received approval on September 26, 2008, due to potential interference from a nearby radio station in Kentville, CIJK-FM 89.3, which received CRTC approval to broadcast in 2007.

References

External links
 

Hsb